Idea leuconoe, also known as the paper kite butterfly, rice paper butterfly, large tree nymph, or in Australia the white nymph butterfly, is a butterfly known especially for its presence in butterfly houses and live butterfly expositions. It has a wingspan of 12 to 14 cm. The paper kite is of Southeast Asian origin, but can also be found in Northern Australia and Southern Taiwan.

Larvae feed on Parsonsia species, Tylophora hispida, Parsonsia helicandra, Parsonsia spiralis, and Cynanchum formosanum so both the butterfly and larvae are poisonous.

Description
The paper kite butterfly's forewings and hindwings are translucent silvery white with black spots, similar to the Idea lynceus.

Subspecies
Listed alphabetically:
I. l. athesis Fruhstorfer, 1911
I. l. caesena Fruhstorfer, 1911
I. l. chersonesia (Fruhstorfer, 1898)
I. l. clara (Butler, 1867)
I. l. engania (Doherty, 1891)
I. l. esanga Fruhstorfer, 1898
I. l. fregela Fruhstorfer, 1911
I. l. godmani Oberthür, 1878
I. l. gordita Fruhstorfer, 1911
I. l. javana Fruhstorfer, 1896
I. l. kwashotoensis (Sonan, 1928)
I. l. lasiaka van Eecke, 1913
I. l. leuconoe Erichson, 1834
I. l. moira Fruhstorfer, 1910
I. l. natunensis Snellen, 1895
I. l. nigriana Grose-Smith, 1895
I. l. obscura Staudinger, 1889
I. l. princesa Staudinger, 1889
I. l. samara Fruhstorfer, 1910
I. l. siamensis (Godfrey, 1916)
I. l. solyma Fruhstorfer, 1910
I. l. vedana Fruhstorfer, 1906
I. l. vicetia Fruhstorfer, 1911

Gallery

References

External links 

Captain's Guide 
Idea leuconoe page on the Butterfly Pavilion's site

Butterflies described in 1834
Idea (butterfly)
Butterflies of Indonesia
Butterflies of Malaysia
Butterflies of Indochina